Andorra will compete at the 2014 Summer Youth Olympics, in Nanjing, China from 16 August to 28 August 2014.

Basketball

Andorra qualified a boys' and girls' based on the 1 June 2014 FIBA 3x3 National Federation Rankings.

Skills Competition

Boys' Tournament

Roster
 Coy de Bofarull
 Sergi Jimenez Marquez
 Sergi Jordana Faus
 Riera Lliteras

Group Stage

Girls' Tournament

Roster
 Claudia Brunet Solano
 Anna Mana Buscall
 Laura Navarro Marin
 Maria Vidal Segalas

Group Stage

Canoeing

Andorra was given a spot to compete from the Tripartite Commission.

Girls

Swimming

Andorra qualified one swimmer.

Boys

References

2014 in Andorran sport
Nations at the 2014 Summer Youth Olympics
Andorra at the Youth Olympics